Yugoslav First Federal Basketball League career stats leaders are the stats leaders of the now-defunct the Yugoslav First Federal Basketball League (FFBL), the top-tier level professional basketball league in SFR Yugoslavia.

List of career scoring leaders  
The following is a list of Yugoslav First Federal Basketball League players by total career points scored.

See also
Yugoslav First Federal League season by season scoring leaders

References

External links
WorldHoopStats.com Former Yugoslav Basketball League

First Federal Basketball League